Elections to Carrickfergus Borough Council were held on 18 May 1977 on the same day as the other Northern Irish local government elections. The election used three district electoral areas to elect a total of 15 councillors.

Election results

Note: "Votes" are the first preference votes.

Districts summary

|- class="unsortable" align="centre"
!rowspan=2 align="left"|Ward
! % 
!Cllrs
! % 
!Cllrs
! %
!Cllrs
! %
!Cllrs
! %
!Cllrs
!rowspan=2|TotalCllrs
|- class="unsortable" align="center"
!colspan=2 bgcolor="" | Alliance
!colspan=2 bgcolor="" | UUP
!colspan=2 bgcolor="" | DUP
!colspan=2 bgcolor="" | UPNI
!colspan=2 bgcolor="white"| Others
|-
|align="left"|Area A
|bgcolor="#F6CB2F"|29.9
|bgcolor="#F6CB2F"|2
|29.2
|2
|12.1
|0
|10.4
|0
|18.4
|1
|5
|-
|align="left"|Area B
|36.6
|2
|bgcolor="40BFF5"|38.6
|bgcolor="40BFF5"|2
|12.2
|1
|0.0
|0
|12.6
|0
|5
|-
|align="left"|Area C
|23.3
|1
|13.8
|1
|bgcolor="#D46A4C"|28.9
|bgcolor="#D46A4C"|2
|20.7
|1
|13.3
|0
|5
|-
|- class="unsortable" class="sortbottom" style="background:#C9C9C9"
|align="left"| Total
|30.1
|5
|27.5
|5
|17.6
|3
|10.1
|1
|14.7
|1
|15
|-
|}

Districts results

Area A

1973: 2 x UUP, 1 x United Loyalist, 1 x Alliance
1977: 2 x Alliance, 2 x UUP, 1 x United Loyalist
1973-1977 Change: Alliance gain from United Loyalist

Area B

1973: 2 x UUP, 1 x Alliance, 1 x United Loyalist, 1 x Independent
1977: 2 x UUP, 2 x Alliance, 1 x DUP
1973-1977 Change: Alliance and DUP gain from United Loyalist and Independent

Area C

1973: 2 x United Loyalist, 1 x UUP, 1 x Alliance, 1 x Loyalist
1977: 2 x DUP, 1 x Alliance, 1 x UPNI, 1 x UUP
1973-1977 Change: DUP (two seats) and UPNI gain from United Loyalist (two seats) and Loyalist

References

Carrickfergus Borough Council elections
Carrickfergus